Sorrentino is a surname of Italian origin, meaning literally "Sorrentinian" or "from Sorrento". Notable people with the surname include: 

Andrea Sorrentino (born 1982), Italian comic book artist
Beth Sorrentino, American pianist and pop singer
Christopher Sorrentino (born 1963), American novelist and short story writer; son of Gilbert
Claudio Sorrentino (born 1945), Italian actor
Dario Sorrentino (1957–2021), Italian medical researcher
Domenico Sorrentino (born 1948), Italian Roman Catholic archbishop
Fernando Sorrentino (born 1942), Argentine short-story writer
Gilbert Sorrentino (1929–2006), American author and poet
Jonah Sorrentino (born 1975), American Christian rapper 
Lorenzo Sorrentino (born 1995), Italian footballer
Michael Sorrentino (born 1982), American television personality
Paolo Sorrentino (born 1970), Italian film director and screenwriter
Rosanne Sorrentino (born 1968), American actress, Annie
Stefano Sorrentino (born 1979), Italian football player
Tonino Sorrentino (born 1985), Italian football player

Italian-language surnames
Toponymic surnames